These 192 genera belong to Leptodirini, a tribe of small carrion beetles in the family Leiodidae. There are at least 750 described species in Leptodirini.

Leptodirini genera

 Adelopidius Apfelbeck, 1907
 Adelopsella Jeannel, 1908
 Albaniola Jeannel, 1924
 Albanodirus Giachino & Vailati, 1998
 Anillocharis Reitter, 1903
 Anillochlamys Jeannel, 1909
 Anisoscapha Muller, 1917
 Anthroherpon Reitter, 1889
 Antrocharis Abeille de Perrin, 1878
 Antrodulus Knirsch, 1927
 Antrosedes Reitter, 1912
 Aphaobiella Gueorguiev, 1976
 Aphaobius Abeille de Perrin, 1878
 Aphaotus Breit, 1914
 Apholeuonus Reitter, 1889
 Archeoboldoria Ghidini, 1937
 Astagobius Reitter, 1886
 Atticiella Coiffait, 1955
 Augustia Zariquiey, 1927
 Babuniella Karaman, 1954
 Balcanobius Gueorguiev, 1965
 Banatiola Decu, 1967
 Baronniesia Fresneda, Bourdeau & Faille, 2009
 Bathyscia Schiödte, 1848
 Bathyscidius Jeannel, 1910
 Bathysciella Jeannel, 1906
 Bathyscimorphus Jeannel, 1910
 Bathysciola Jeannel, 1910
 Bathysciopsis Muller, 1941
 Bathysciotes Jeannel, 1910
 Bellesia Fresneda & Hernando, 1994
 Beronia Gueorguiev, 1960
 Beroniella Giachino & Gueorguiev, 1991
 Beskovia Gueorguiev, 1960
 Besuchetiola Rampini & Zoia, 1991
 Bithyniella Jeannel, 1955
 Blattochaeta Reitter, 1910
 Blattodromus Reitter, 1904
 Boldoria Jeannel, 1924
 Breuilia Jeannel, 1909
 Breuilites Salgado, 1980
 Bulgariella Karaman, 1958
 Bureschiana Gueorguiev, 1963
 Canavesiella Giachino, 1993
 Cansiliella Paoletti, 1972
 Cantabrogeus Salgado, 2000
 Capraiola Zoia & Rampini, 1994
 Cavazzutiella Casale & Giachino, 1985
 Ceretophyes Comas & Escola, 1989
 Ceuthmonocharis Jeannel, 1910
 Ceuthophyes Jeannel, 1924
 Charonites Apfelbeck, 1907
 Closania Jeannel, 1928
 Coiffaitiola Jeannel, 1955
 Coreobathyscia Szymczakowski, 1975
 Croatodirus Casale, Giachino & Jalzic, 2000
 Cryptobathyscia Vailati, 1980
 Cytodromus Abeille de Perrin, 1876
 Dalmatiola Jeannel, 1924
 Deelemaniella Perreau, 2002
 Dellabeffaella Capra, 1924
 Diaprysius Abeille de Perrin, 1878
 Drimeotus Miller, 1856
 Elladoherpon Casale, 1983
 Espanoliella Gueorguiev, 1976
 Euryspeonomus Jeannel, 1919
 Genestiellina Giachino, 1996
 Gesciella Giachino & Guéorguiev, 1989
 Graciliella Njunjić et al., 2016
 Gueorguievella Giachino & Gueorguiev, 2006
 Hadesia Muller, 1911
 Halbherria Conci & Tamanini, 1951
 Haplotropidius Muller, 1903
 Henrotiella Perreau, 1999
 Hexaurus Reitter, 1884
 Hoffmannella Muller, 1912
 Huetheriella Jeannel, 1934
 Hussonella Jeannel, 1934
 Icharonia Reitter, 1912
 Insubriella Vailati, 1990
 Iranobathyscia Zoia & Rampini, 1994
 Isereus Reitter, 1886
 Josettekia Belles & Deliot, 1983
 Karadeniziella Casale & Giachino, 1989
 Katobatizon Knirsch, 1928
 Kircheria Giachino & Vailati, 2006
 Lagariella Fresneda, 2000
 Laneyriella Gueorguiev, 1976
 Leonesiella Salgado, 1996
 Leonhardella Reitter, 1903
 Leonhardia Reitter, 1901
 Leptodirus Schmidt, 1832
 Leptomeson Jeannel, 1924
 Leptostagus Karaman, 1954
 Lessiniella Pavan, 1941
 Lotharia Mandl, 1944
 Magdelainella Jeannel, 1924
 Maroniella Casale & Giachino, 1985
 Mehadiella Csiki, 1899
 Monguzziella Vailati, 1993
 Muelleriella Jeannel, 1924
 Nafarroa Fresneda & Dupré, 2010
 Naspunius Fresneda, Hernando & Lagar, 1994
 Nauticiella Moravec & Mlejnek, 2002
 Neobathyscia Muller, 1917
 Netolitzkya Muller, 1913
 Nonveilleriella Perreau & Pavicevic, 2008
 Notidocharis Jeannel, 1956
 Ochridiola Sbordoni, 1971
 Oresigenus Jeannel, 1948
 Orostygia Muller, 1912
 Oryotus Miller, 1856
 Ovobathysciola Jeannel, 1924
 Pallaresiella Fresneda, 1998
 Pangaeoniola G. & M.Etonti, 1985
 Parabathyscia Jeannel, 1908
 Paranillochlamys Zariquiey, 1940
 Parantrophilon Noesske, 1914
 Parapropus Ganglbauer, 1899
 Paraspeonomus Coiffait, 1952
 Paratroglophyes Fourès, 1954
 Parvospeonomus Bellés & Escolà, 1977
 Patriziella Jeannel, 1956
 Pavicevicia Perreau, 2008
 Perriniella Jeannel, 1910
 Phacomorphus Jeannel, 1908
 Phaneropella Jeannel, 1910
 Pholeuodromus Breit, 1913
 Pholeuon Hampe, 1856
 Pholeuonella Jeannel, 1910
 Pholeuonidius Jeannel, 1911
 Pholeuonopsis Apfelbeck, 1901
 Pisidiella Jeannel, 1930
 Platycholeus Horn, 1880
 Pretneria Muller, 1931
 Proleonhardella Jeannel, 1910
 Proleptodirina Perkovsky, 1997
 Prospelaeobates Giachino & Etonti, 1996
 Protobracharthron Reitter, 1889
 Protopholeuon Jeannel, 1923
 Pseudobathyscidius Karaman, 1964
 Pseudoboldoria Ghidini, 1937
 Pseudospeonomus Comas, Fresneda & Salgado, 2007
 Purkynella Knirsch, 1926
 Quaestus Schaufuss, 1861
 Radevia Knirsch, 1925
 Radziella Casale & Jalzic, 1988
 Ravasinia Muller, 1922
 Redensekia Karaman, 1953
 Reinholdina Giachino & Moravec, 2009
 Remyella Jeannel, 1931
 Rhaetiella Giachino & Vailati, 2005
 Rhodopiola Gueorguiev, 1960
 Roubaliella Jeannel, 1925
 Royerella Jeannel, 1910
 Rozajella Curcic, Brajkovic & Curcic, 2007
 Salgadoia Fresneda, 1998
 Sbordoniola Zoia & Rampini, 1994
 Sengletiola Zoia & Rampini, 1994
 Serbopholeuonopsis Ćurčić & Boškova, 2002
 Setnikia Breit, 1913
 Sinobathyscia Perreau, 1999
 Sinuicollia Piva, 2008
 Sophrochaeta Reitter, 1884
 Spelaeobates Muller, 1901
 Spelaeochlamys Dieck, 1871
 Spelaeodromus Reitter, 1884
 Spelaites Apfelbeck, 1907
 Speocharidius Jeannel, 1919
 Speocharinus Espaol & Escola, 1977
 Speodiaetus Jeannel, 1908
 Speonesiotes Jeannel, 1910
 Speonomidius Jeannel, 1924
 Speonomites Jeannel, 1910
 Speonomus Jeannel, 1908
 Speophyes Jeannel, 1910
 Speoplanes Muller, 1911
 Sphaerobathyscia Muller, 1917
 Stygiophyes Fresneda, 1998
 Tartariella Nonveiller & Pavicevic, 1999
 Tismanella Jeannel, 1928
 Trapezodirus Jeannel, 1924
 Trocharanis Reitter, 1884
 Troglocharinus Reitter, 1908
 Troglodromus Sainte-Claire Deville, 1901
 Troglophyes Abeille de Perrin, 1894
 Velebitodromus Casale, Giachino & Jalžic, 2004
 Viallia Pavan, 1950
 Weiratheria Zariquiey, 1927
 Zariquieyella Jeannel, 1928
 † Aranzadiella Espaol, 1972
 † Petkovskiella Gueorguiev, 1976

References

Taxonomic lists (genera, alphabetic)